Presidential elections were held in Tajikistan on 6 November 2006. The result was a victory for incumbent President Emomali Rahmonov, who won a third term in office after receiving 80% of the vote.

Candidates
Five candidates contested the elections:
Emomali Rahmonov — incumbent president and a member of the dominant People's Democratic Party of Tajikistan. Constitutional provisions that had barred Rahmonov from seeking further terms had been controversially removed.
Abduhalim Ghafforov — registered as representing the Socialist Party, although this is not the original Socialist Party, which was denied registration.
Amir Qaroqulov — Agrarian Party
Olimzhon Boboyev — Party of Economic Reforms
Ismoil Talbakov — Communist Party of Tajikistan

The Islamic Renaissance Party of Tajikistan, the Democratic Party, and the Social Democratic Party all boycotted the elections, criticising the country's electoral apparatus as unreliable and refusing to accept the constitutional changes that allowed  Rakhmanov to seek a third term.

Campaign
A rally by opposition parties was broken up. According to the BBC, none of the four candidates opposing Rahmonov have publicly criticised him, and the Organization for Security and Co-operation in Europe has said that "[n]o signs of a competitive campaign have been observed thus far".

Conduct
CIS election monitors declared the elections "legal, free and transparent", while the OSCE condemned them, and the election has been called "flawed and unfair but peaceful."

Results

References

Tajikistan
Presidential election
Presidential elections in Tajikistan